The Abbey Farm House in Yeovil, Somerset, England was built around 1420 and has been designated as a Grade I listed building.

The Ham stone farmhouse was built by John Stourton (died 1438), also known as 'Jenkyn' Stourton. As part of the manor of Preston Plucknett it was originally known as Preston Great Farm, and has always been in lay-ownership. The addition of "abbey" only occurred in the 19th century for reasons unknown.

It is closely associated with the Abbey Barn which is also Grade I listed.

See also
 List of Grade I listed buildings in South Somerset

References

Buildings and structures completed in 1420
Houses completed in the 15th century
Grade I listed buildings in South Somerset
Buildings and structures in Yeovil
Grade I listed houses in Somerset
Hamstone buildings